The majority of the countries of the Commonwealth of Nations, formerly known as the British Commonwealth, still criminalise sexual acts between consenting adults of the same sex and other forms of sexual orientation, gender identity and expression. Homosexual activity remains a criminal offence in 32 of the 56 sovereign states of the Commonwealth; and legal in only 24.

This has been described as being the result of "the major historical influence" or legacy of the British Empire. In most cases, it was former colonial administrators that established anti-gay legislation or sodomy acts during the 19th century and even earlier. The majority of countries have retained these laws following independence. Due to the common origin of historical penal codes in many former British colonies, the prohibition of homosexual acts, specifically anal sex between men, is provided for in Section 377 in the penal codes of 42 former British colonies, many of whom are today members of the Commonwealth.

The penalties for private, consensual sexual conduct between same sex adults remain harsh in a number of Commonwealth countries. They include 10 years' imprisonment and hard labour in Jamaica, 14 years in Kenya, and 20 years plus flogging in Malaysia. A cluster of member states have a maximum sentence of life imprisonment: Bangladesh, Guyana, Pakistan, Sierra Leone, Tanzania and Uganda. Meanwhile, Brunei and Northern Nigeria have a maximum penalty for male homosexuality of death. In some countries such as Cameroon, arrests and imprisonment for acts that indicate homosexuality are frequently reported. In Uganda and Nigeria, recent legislative proposals would significantly increase the penalties for homosexuality.

Overview

Homosexual activity remains a criminal offence in 34 (see below) of the 54 sovereign states of the Commonwealth and legal in only 19 (see below).

However, developments in the area of employment discrimination suggests some progress is being made, with member states such as the Seychelles (2006), Fiji (2007), Mozambique (2007), Mauritius (2008) and Botswana (2010) introducing legislation against employment discrimination based on sexual orientation. In November 2012, Malawi's President Joyce Banda suspended all laws that criminalised homosexuality.

A report produced in November 2015 by the Human Dignity Trust in association with the Commonwealth Lawyers' Association claims that countries that continue to criminalize same-sex relationships were worsening the impacts of the HIV/AIDS crisis. The report estimates that some 2.9 billion people live in Commonwealth countries where consensual homosexuality is punishable, and approximately 174 million living there may identify as LGBT. It found that:

Discussions at Commonwealth level

Interventions by Secretaries-General

In July 2011 it was reported that the Commonwealth Secretary General, Kamalesh Sharma, had spoken out against discrimination towards people who were gay or lesbian while on a visit to Australia, arguing that “vilification and targeting on grounds of sexual orientation are at odds with the values of the Commonwealth”. This was the first time that such a senior Commonwealth figure had spoken publicly on the issue. Sharma re-emphasised the point in his keynote speech at the opening ceremony of the Commonwealth Heads of Government meeting:Commonwealth Secretary-General Baroness Patricia Scotland, who took office on 1 April 2016, committed herself to using the first two years of her tenure to promote decriminalization of homosexuality in the Commonwealth countries that list homosexual behaviour as a crime. However, she has suggested that the way forward needs to built through establishing consensus:

Perth Commonwealth Conference

The British human rights campaigner Peter Tatchell and the South Australian Labor MLC Ian Hunter called for LGBT rights to be put on the agenda of the Commonwealth Heads of Government Meeting (CHOGM) to be held in Perth at the end of October 2011.

This found further support when the Perth Member of the Legislative Assembly, John Hyde, called on Premier Colin Barnett to use his access to CHOGM delegates to address the issue of human rights for gay men and lesbians. Finally, it was confirmed that the Australian Foreign Minister, Kevin Rudd, would intervene at the October meeting with a request to scrap anti-LGBT laws. The discussion on LGBT rights at the Perth meeting received a muted response from most of the attending delegates despite strong support from the UK, Canada, Australia, and New Zealand. Agreement could not be reached to publish a report by Eminent Persons which looked at the Commonwealth's future relevance and demanded that all member states that outlawed homosexuality lift their bans.

Malta Conference

In November 2015, Baroness Verma, Under-Secretary of State at the UK's Department for International Development, announced that she would be chairing a round table on LGBT issues at the Commonwealth Heads of Government meeting in Malta.

Subsequently, in 2016 the Prime Minister of Malta, Joseph Muscat, urged Commonwealth countries to remove anti-LGBT laws while speaking at the Service of Celebration for Commonwealth Day at Westminster Abbey. Queen Elizabeth, Head of the Commonwealth, was present.

In June 2017, the Commonwealth approved the accreditation of the Commonwealth Equality Network (TCEN), making it the first LGBTI-focussed organisation to be officially accredited. Accreditation means that Equality Network activists will benefit from increased access to, participation in and information about Commonwealth matters.

United Kingdom

The British Prime Minister, David Cameron, indicated his support:

The Minister for International Development, Andrew Mitchell, subsequently indicated that the UK would withhold development aid from countries that had a poor human rights record in relation to its LGBT citizens. Malawi subsequently had £19 million of budget support suspended by the UK following various infractions including poor progress on human rights and media freedoms and concern over the government's approach to rights of its LGBT citizens. This was later reinforced by David Cameron, who emphasised that those receiving UK aid should "adhere to proper human rights". After the Government of Seychelles agreed to push forward with plans to repeal the country's anti-gay law, they specifically noted advocacy from British diplomats.

In 2014, the British Foreign Secretary, William Hague, wrote to the Commonwealth Secretary-General urging him to use his position to urge member states to live up to their responsibilities to promote the rights of their LGBT citizens. He later argued that Britain should must make defending the rights of gay and lesbian people a key plank of its relations with other Commonwealth countries.

In April 2018, Britain hosted the Heads of Government meeting in London. The British Prime Minister, Theresa May, said she regretted that many of the current laws across Commonwealth countries that criminalised homosexuality were a direct legacy of British colonialism; and offered to support any government that wanted to reform its legislation. More than 100,000 people had signed a petition calling for the issue of LGBT rights to be raised at the meeting.

Commonwealth LGBT advocacy organisations

Kaleidoscope Trust

The Kaleidoscope Trust was established in London in 2011 to lobby Britain's politicians so that ministers discuss LGBT (Lesbian, Gay, Bisexual and Transgender) issues whenever they host their counterparts. It specifically aims to revoke anti-LGBT laws within the Commonwealth using business and political pressure. The singers Elton John and George Michael offered support, with Elton John attending the launch.

Commonwealth nations where homosexuality is not a criminal offence

Where same-sex marriage is legal

Europe 

 United Kingdom† (UK)
 Akrotiri and Dhekelia† (UK)
 Gibraltar† (UK)
 Guernsey, Alderney and Sark† (UK)
 Isle of Man† (UK)
 Jersey† (UK) 
 Malta†

Asia 

  British Indian Ocean Territory† (UK)

Africa 

  South Africa†
  Saint Helena, Ascension Island & Tristan da Cunha† (UK)

Americas 

 Falkland Islands† (UK)
 South Georgia and the South Sandwich Islands† (UK)
 Canada†

Oceania 

 Australia†
 Pitcairn Islands† (UK)
 New Zealand†
 British Antarctic Territory† (UK)

Where same sex-relationships are recognised

Europe 

 Cyprus†

Americas 

 Bermuda† (UK)
 Cayman Islands† (UK)

Asia 

  India

With discrimination protections

Africa 

  Botswana 
  Mozambique (Employment only)
  Seychelles† (Employment only)

Asia 

  India
  Singapore (Only protections from incitement of religiously motivated anti-LGBT harassment and violence)

Americas 

 Barbados (Employment, sexual orientation only)
 British Virgin Islands† (UK)
 Montserrat† (UK)
 Turks and Caicos Islands† (UK)
 Belize

Oceania 

 Fiji† (Employment only)

Same-sex activity legal, no discrimination protection

Africa 

 Gabon†
 Lesotho
 Rwanda†

Americas 

 Anguilla (UK)†
 Antigua and Barbuda
 Bahamas†
 Saint Kitts and Nevis
 Trinidad and Tobago

Oceania 

 Nauru†
 Tokelau (NZ)†
 Vanuatu†

Notes: †Signed UN General Assembly declaration in favour of LGBT rights. ‡Signed alternative Statement against LGBT rights.

Commonwealth nations where homosexuality is a criminal offence

Not enforced and with discrimination protections

Africa 
  Mauritius† (Employment only)

Asia 

  Sri Lanka (Functionally decriminalised with wide-ranging discrimination protections)

Oceania 
  Cook Islands (NZ)† (Employment only)
  Samoa† (Employment only)

Not enforced

Africa 
  Malawi‡
  Namibia
  Sierra Leone
  Eswatini †

Americas 
  Dominica†
  Jamaica
  Grenada
  Guyana
  Saint Lucia‡
  Saint Vincent and the Grenadines

Oceania 
  Kiribati
  Niue (NZ)†
  Tonga
  Tuvalu
  Papua New Guinea
  Solomon Islands†

Punished by imprisonment

Africa 
  Cameroon‡
   Gambia 
   Ghana 
  Kenya‡
  Southern Nigeria‡
  Tanzania‡
  Togo‡
  Uganda‡
   Zambia

Asia 
  Bangladesh‡
  Malaysia‡
  Maldives
  Pakistan‡

Death penalty

Asia 

 Brunei‡ (Not enforced)

Africa 

 Northern Nigeria‡

Notes: †Signed UN General Assembly declaration in favour of LGBT rights. ‡Signed alternative Statement against LGBT rights.

See also 

 LGBT rights by country or territory
 LGBT rights in La Francophonie

Notes and references

Notes

References 

Commonwealth of Nations
Commonwealth of Nations